The 2017–18 Creighton Bluejays women's basketball team represents Creighton University in the 2017–18 NCAA Division I women's basketball season. The Bluejays, led by fifteenth year head coach Jim Flanery, play their home games at D. J. Sokol Arena and were members of the Big East Conference. They finished the season 19–13, 11–7 in Big East play to finish in fourth place. They advanced to the semifinals of the Big East women's tournament where they lost to Marquette. They received an at-large bid to the NCAA women's tournament where they defeated Iowa in the first round before losing to UCLA in the second round.

Previous season
They finished the season 24–8, 16–2 in Big East play to share the Big East regular season title with DePaul. They advanced to the semifinals of the Big East women's tournament where they lost to Marquette. They received an at-large bid to the NCAA women's tournament where they defeated Toledo in the first round before losing to Oregon State in the second round.

Roster

Schedule

|-
!colspan=9 style=|Exhibition

|-
!colspan=9 style=| Non-conference regular season

|-
!colspan=9 style=| Big East regular season

|-
!colspan=9 style=| Big East Women's Tournament

|-
!colspan=9 style=| NCAA Women's Tournament

Rankings
2017–18 NCAA Division I women's basketball rankings

See also
 2017–18 Creighton Bluejays men's basketball team

References

Creighton
Creighton Bluejays women's basketball seasons
Creighton
Creighton Bluejays
Creighton Bluejays